Manjit Singh may refer to:

 Manjit Singh (armament scientist) (born 1958), Indian scientist
 Manjit Singh (footballer) (born 1986), Indian football player 
 Manjit Singh (runner) (born 1989) Indian middle-distance runner
 Manjit Singh (strongman), Indian-English strongman 
 Manjit Singh (soldier), Indian brigadier